Karsten Hansen (29 September 1926 – 7 August 2009) was a Norwegian footballer. He played in three matches for the Norway national football team from 1950 to 1952.

References

External links
 

1926 births
2009 deaths
Norwegian footballers
Norway international footballers
Place of birth missing
Association footballers not categorized by position